The UNESCO World Heritage Site Historic Monuments of Ancient Nara encompasses eight places in the old capital Nara in Nara Prefecture, Japan. Five are Buddhist temples, one is a Shinto shrine, one is a Palace and one a primeval forest. The properties include 26 buildings designated by the Japanese Government as National Treasures as well as 53 designated as Important Cultural Properties. All compounds have been recognized as Historic Sites. The Nara Palace Site was designated as Special Historic Site and the Kasugayama Primeval Forest as Special Natural Monument. Tōdai-ji, Kōfuku-ji and the Kasugayama Primeval Forest overlap with Nara Park, a park designated as one of the "Places of Scenic Beauty" by the Ministry of Education, Culture, Sports, Science and Technology (MEXT).  UNESCO listed the site as World Heritage in 1998.

List of sites
The table lists information about each of the 8 listed properties of the World Heritage Site listing for the Historic Monuments of Ancient Nara:
Name: in English and Japanese
Type: Purpose of the site. The list includes five Buddhist temples ("-ji"), one Shinto shrine ("-jinja"), one palace and one primeval forest.
Period: time period of significance, typically of construction
Location: the site's location (by ward) and by geographic coordinates
Description: brief description of the site

See also 
 List of World Heritage Sites in Japan
Tourism in Japan

References

External links 
Nara's World Heritage, from The Official Nara Travel Guide

World Heritage Sites in Japan
Tourist attractions in Nara Prefecture
History of Nara Prefecture
Buildings and structures in Nara Prefecture